GCAM may refer to:

 Gulf Coast Archive and Museum, an LGBT history organization located in Neartown, Houston, Texas
 General Commission for Audiovisual Media (Saudi Arabia)
 Google Camera (GCam)